The 2000 World Team Table Tennis Championships were held in Kuala Lumpur from February 19 to February 26, 2000. The Team Championships were originally part of the 1999 World Championships program scheduled to be held in Belgrade, Yugoslavia but were postponed after the NATO bombing of Yugoslavia during the Kosovo War in March 1999.

Results

Team

References

External links
ITTF Museum

World Table Tennis Championships
2000 World Table Tennis Championships
World Table Tennis Championships
World Table Tennis Championships
Table tennis competitions in Malaysia
Sports competitions in Kuala Lumpur
2000s in Kuala Lumpur
February 2000 sports events in Europe